Girolamo Maria Casalini (born 17 Dec 1915 in Siena) was an Italian clergyman and bishop for the Roman Catholic Diocese of Manzini. He was ordained in 1938. He was appointed in 1965. He died in 1982.

References 

Italian Roman Catholic bishops
1915 births
1982 deaths